Government High School Bogray (Urdu: گورنمنٹ ہائی اسکول بوگرے; abbreviated to GHS Bogray), is a high school for boys located in a small town Bogray, Tehsil Daska, Sialkot, Punjab, Pakistan.

History 
Initially GHS Bogray was established as Government Primary School in 1921 in British era, Middle upgraded in 1952. It was granted High School status by Government of the Punjab in 1986. With the efforts of school management it was converted into Model School and added few more buildings in 2011.

Academics 
The school prepares the boys for the Primary, Middle and Secondary School Examinations conducted by the District Education Board and Board of Intermediate and Secondary Education, Gujranwala. Students excel in each examination of the local board and have achieved distinctions in further education. After completing education from the school, many Bogrians have gone on to secure top positions in all major universities of Pakistan.

Infrastructure 
The school is spread over an area of about 4 acres (16,187 m2). It has Physics, Biology, Chemistry, Computer Labs and a Library.

Photo gallery

References

Schools in Punjab, Pakistan